Anthems (subtitled A Celebration of Australia) is a greatest hits album by Australian country music artist John Williamson and was released in August 2000. The album features 20 of Williamson's most patriotic recordings, peaked at number 16 on the ARIA Charts and was certified gold.

The album's release co-incided with the 2000 Olympic Games in Sydney in which Williamson performed.

Track listing

Charts

Certifications

Release history

References

2000 compilation albums
John Williamson (singer) compilation albums
EMI Records compilation albums